Scrub Island is an  island lying off the eastern tip of the main island of Anguilla, a British Overseas Territory in the Caribbean. It is easily reached by boat. Privately owned, the remains of an abandoned air field still exist. There are several abandoned houses on the island, mainly due to damage from hurricanes. There is no electricity or plumbing.

Fauna
The island has been identified as an Important Bird Area by BirdLife International, mainly because  of its nesting seabirds.  These are laughing gulls as well as royal, roseate and least terns.  Resident landbirds include Caribbean elaenias and pearly-eyed thrashers.  The island's five species of reptiles comprise the Anguilla Bank ameiva, Anolis gingivinus, little dwarf gecko, island dwarf gecko and the endangered leeward island racer.  Green and leatherback turtles have been recorded.  Feral goats and rats are present. Whales are commonly seen west of Scrub, along the southern coastline.

References

External links
Exploring Scrub Island

Islands of Anguilla
Geography of Anguilla
Private islands of the Caribbean
Important Bird Areas of Anguilla
Seabird colonies